Edward Masters (1838 – 27 November 1881) was a 19th-century Member of Parliament from Westland, New Zealand.

Masters was born in Melbourne in 1838. He was Mayor of Greymouth for several terms.

He sent his resignation from Melbourne in May 1881, stating that his medical advisers feared for his life if he travelled to New Zealand in his poor state of health. Masters died later in the year in Richmond, Melbourne, on 27 November. He was 43 years old and is buried at Kew Cemetery.

References

1838 births
1881 deaths
Members of the New Zealand House of Representatives
Mayors of Grey
New Zealand MPs for South Island electorates
People from Melbourne
Australian emigrants to New Zealand
19th-century New Zealand politicians